The 2022 Army Black Knights football team represented the United States Military Academy in the 2022 NCAA Division I FBS football season. The Black Knights were led by ninth-year head coach Jeff Monken and played their home games at Michie Stadium in West Point, New York. They competed as an independent. The Black Knights finished the season with a record of 6–6, beating Navy but losing possession of the Commander-in-Chief's Trophy after a loss to Air Force. They were not invited to a bowl as only five of their six wins counted for bowl eligibility, with the sixth coming against their second FCS opponent of the year.

Previous season

The Black Knights finished the 2021 season with a record of 9–4, sharing the Commander-in-Chief's Trophy with Navy and Air Force after all three service academies finished with 1–1 records against each other. They were invited to the Armed Forces Bowl where they defeated Missouri, 24–22.

Personnel

Coaching staff

 John Loose also served as the linebackers coach at Army from 1992 to 1999.
 Scott Swanson also served as an assistant strength & conditioning coach at Army from 1995 to 1996.
 Tucker Waugh also served as the wide receivers coach at Army from 2000 to 2004.

Source:

Roster
The Army football roster for the start of the 2022 season (as of September 3, 2022):

Schedule

Source:

Game summaries

at Coastal Carolina

UTSA

No. 7 (FCS) Villanova

Georgia State

at No. 15 Wake Forest

Colgate

Louisiana–Monroe

vs. Air Force

at Troy Trojans

UConn

at UMass

vs. Navy

This year's Army-Navy Game uniforms for the Army Black Knights are dedicated to the soldiers of the 1st Armored Division during World War II. This year marks the 80th anniversary of Operation Torch, which was the start of the United States' ground operations in Europe and North Africa. The "Iron Soldiers" defeated Axis forces in North African harsh desert conditions. 

Approximately 125,000 soldiers landed in Algeria and French Morocco in November 1942 in what was the largest amphibious landing in history of the time.

The helmet decal has the 1st Armored Division's unit patch which includes cavalry (yellow), infantry (blue), and field artillery (red). The black of the helmet read "Old Ironsides" unit's nickname.

The uniform (jersey and pants) feature a "mud splatter" look to highlight the harsh conditions experienced by the unit's tanks. The kahcki (green/brown) colors and number font are the same as those used on the M3 tanks during World War II. The green represents the fields of Europe, while the brown is for the deserts of Africa. The "1Δ" on the pants is the insignia of the 1st Armored Division and was how their vehicles would be identified in the field.

References

Army
Army Black Knights football seasons
Army Black Knights